Zarhok (Russian and Tajik: Зархок Zarkhok) is a village in the Republic of Tajikistan. It is part of the city of Isfara in Sughd Region. It is located in the foothills of the Turkestan Range, on the river Isfara. It is in the centre of the largest fruit and vegetable producing region in Tajikistan.

References

Populated places in Sughd Region